The 2000–01 daytime network television schedule for the six major English-language commercial broadcast networks in the United States in operation during that television season covers the weekday daytime hours from September 2000 to August 2001. The schedule is followed by a list per network of returning series, new series, and series canceled after the 1999–2000 season.

Affiliates fill time periods not occupied by network programs with local or syndicated programming. PBS – which offers daytime programming through a children's program block, PBS Kids – is not included, as its member television stations have local flexibility over most of their schedules and broadcast times for network shows may vary. Also not included are stations affiliated with Pax TV, as its schedule is composed mainly of syndicated reruns although it also carried a limited schedule of first-run programs.

Legend

 New series are highlighted in bold.

Schedule
 All times correspond to U.S. Eastern and Pacific Time scheduling (except for some live sports or events). Except where affiliates slot certain programs outside their network-dictated timeslots, subtract one hour for Central, Mountain, Alaska, and Hawaii-Aleutian times.
 Local schedules may differ, as affiliates have the option to pre-empt or delay network programs. Such scheduling may be limited to preemptions caused by local or national breaking news or weather coverage (which may force stations to tape delay certain programs in overnight timeslots or defer them to a co-operated or other contracted station in their regular timeslot) and any major sports events scheduled to air in a weekday timeslot (mainly during major holidays). Stations may air shows at other times at their preference.

Monday-Friday

Notes:
 NBC allowed owned-and-operated and affiliated stations the preference of airing Passions and Days of Our Lives in reverse order from the network's recommended scheduling, a structure held over from when Another World occupied the 2:00 p.m. ET timeslot prior to its discontinuance in July 1999.
 The WB returned its morning children's programming block to its affiliates on September 3. A few of its affiliates deferred the block to the afternoon in order to air morning newscasts or other syndicated programs.

Saturday

Sunday

By network

ABC

Returning series:
ABC World News Tonight with Peter Jennings
All My Children
Doug (reruns)
General Hospital
Good Morning America
Mickey Mouse Works
The New Adventures of Winnie the Pooh (reruns)
One Life to Live
Pepper Ann
Port Charles
Recess
Sabrina: The Animated Series
This Week with Sam & Cokie
The View
The Weekenders

New series:
Buzz Lightyear of Star Command
House of Mouse
Lloyd in Space
Teacher's Pet

Not returning from 1999-2000:
The Bugs Bunny and Tweety Show
Schoolhouse Rock!
Squigglevision

CBS

Returning series:
As the World Turns
The Bold and the Beautiful
The Early Show
CBS Evening News with Dan Rather
CBS News Sunday Morning
Face the Nation
Franklin
Guiding Light
The Price is Right
The Saturday Early Show
The Young and the Restless

New series:
Blue's Clues
Dora the Explorer
Kipper
Little Bear
Little Bill

Not returning from 1999-2000:
Anatole
Blaster's Universe
Flying Rhino Junior High
Mythic Warriors
New Tales from the Cryptkeeper
Rescue Heroes (moved to Kids WB)

NBC

Returning series:
City Guys
Days of Our Lives
Hang Time
Meet the Press
NBA Inside Stuff
NBC Nightly News with Tom Brokaw
One World
Passions
Today

New series:
All About Us
Just Deal

Not returning from 1999–2000:
Later Today
Saved by the Bell: The New Class
Sunset Beach

Fox

Returning series:
Action Man
Beast Machines: Transformers
Big Guy and Rusty the Boy Robot
Cybersix
Digimon: Digital Monsters
Dinozaurs
Dungeons & Dragons
Escaflowne
Flint the Time Detective
Fox News Sunday
The Magic School Bus (reruns)
NASCAR Racers
Power Rangers Lightspeed Rescue
Spider-Man Unlimited
X-Men (reruns)

New series:
Kong: The Animated Series
Los Luchadores
Power Rangers Time Force
Real Scary Stories
Roswell Conspiracies
The Zack Files

Not returning from 1999–2000:
Beast Wars: Transformers
Power Rangers Lost Galaxy
Power Rangers Power Playback
Sherlock Holmes in the 22nd Century
The New Woody Woodpecker Show

UPN

Returning series:
Recess
Sabrina: The Animated Series
Pepper Ann

New series:
Buzz Lightyear of Star Command

Not returning from 1999–2000:
Disney's Doug
Hercules

The WB

Returning series:
Batman Beyond
Cardcaptors
Detention
Histeria!
Max Steel
Men in Black: The Series
Pokémon
The Sylvester & Tweety Mysteries

New series:
Cubix: Robots for Everyone
Generation O!
Jackie Chan Adventures
Pokémon: The Johto Journeys
Rescue Heroes: Global Response Team
Static Shock
X-Men: Evolution
The Zeta Project

Not returning from 1999–2000:
The Big Cartoonie Show
The New Batman/Superman Adventures

See also
 2000–01 United States network television schedule (prime-time)
 2000–01 United States network television schedule (late night)

References

Sources
 
 
 
 
 
 

United States weekday network television schedules
2000 in American television
2001 in American television